Jaroslav Pospíšil and Franko Škugor were the defending champions, but they did not participate this year.

Wesley Koolhof and Matwé Middelkoop won the title, defeating Tobias Kamke and Simon Stadler in the final, 6–1, 7–5.

Seeds

Draw

External links
 Main Draw

Marburg Open - Doubles
2014 Doubles